The Society of Revolutionary and Republican Women (Société des Citoyennes Républicaines Révolutionnaires, Société des républicaines révolutionnaires) was a female-led revolutionary organization during the French Revolution. The Society officially began on May 10, 1793 and disbanded on September 16 of the same year. During its existence, the Society managed to draw significant interest within the national political scene, advocating for gender equality in revolutionary politics.

Background

After the beginning of the French Revolution, discussions around the role of women in French society had grown, giving rise to a letter addressed to the King Louis XVI on January 1, 1789, entitled "Petition des femmes du Tiers Etat au roi", that declared the need for equality in educational opportunities between men and women. Furthermore, the letter encompassed the demands of French women and requested general equality between the sexes.      

Their movement was further solidified by the Women's March on Versailles on October 5, 1789, demanding bread from King Louis XVI. Although women, just as men, played many parts in the French Revolution, this was the first event consisting entirely of women. The feminist newspaper “Etrennes Nationales des dames” published an article calling on women to have an active role in the National Assembly and reminding them of the day, October 5, when so many women took a stand. 

In these early years, Etta Palm d'Aelders produced a pamphlet which proposed that a group of women's clubs be organized throughout the country to initiate a welfare program. In that pamphlet she writes:

"Would it not be useful to form, in each Section of the capital, a patriotic society of citoyennes ... [who] would meet in each Section as frequently as they believed useful for the public good and following their own particular rules; each circle would have its own directorate…Thus, it would be in a position to supervise efficiently the enemies harbored in the midst of the capital and to differentiate the genuinely poor person in need of his brothers’ aid from brigands called out by enemies."

The political clubs in France at the time were predominantly men-only and excluded women. Only through mixed fraternal societies were women able to take part in politics. When clubs with women-only membership began to pick up steam, they became very popular in the provinces. While most women understood that the majority of these clubs aimed to support men in the army, some women wanted to fight alongside them. Today, historians have identified approximately thirty women's clubs that began during this period.

The clubs organized themselves well, with each having a presiding body which laid out rules for their specific clubs. These clubs had a membership range of two hundred to six hundred members, with an active attendance of about sixty.

Over time, the women's clubs began to widen their political scope and include other issues in their meetings. Soon, the issue of citizenship began to emerge. Not only did they want the title of citizen, or citoyenne, a designation as an inhabitant of the country; they wanted the rights and responsibilities that came with being a citizen. One woman went before the National Convention to say this:

"Citizen legislators, you have given men a Constitution; now they enjoy all the rights of free beings, but women are very far from sharing these glories. Women count for nothing in the political system. We ask for primary assemblies and, as the Constitution is based on the Rights of Man, we now demand the full exercise of these rights for ourselves."

In 1791, Olympe de Gouges published one of the most prominent women's rights documents of that time period: The Declaration of the Rights of Woman and of the Female Citizen. This document introduced the issue of women's rights directly into the French Revolution. It argued that sexual equality had a place in the revolution and that women deserved equal rights.

Origins
In 1793, political chaos reigned. The Jacobins, the leading political force of the era, now allied with the sans-culottes and the Cordeliers, a radical political club in Paris. The coalition took a far left position, supporting price controls and ruthless punishments against those who disputed their views. Rivaling them were the Girondins, who maintained support for a free market. In February 1793, a group of women from the Section des Quatre Nations requested the use of the meeting hall of the Jacobins, for a meeting of their own. The Jacobins refused. Some say that they feared a "massive women's protest". The group of women, who now called themselves the Assembly of Republican Women, persisted and received permission from the Fraternal Society of Patriots of Both Sexes to use their meeting hall. This Assembly's main aim was toward economic stability. However, for some this was not enough. They wanted more political activity. 

On May 10, 1793, the Society of Revolutionary Republican Women was formed; it was a feminist society, however it saw it's primary role as defending the revolution. Founders of this society Pauline Léon and Claire Lancombe officially registered The Society of Revolutionary Republican Women at the Paris Commune:
 
"Several citoyennes presented themselves to the secretariat of the municipality and…declared their intention of assembling and forming a society which admits only women. The Society has for its objective deliberation on the means of frustrating the projects of the republic's enemies. It will bear the name of Revolutionary Republic Society and will meet in the library of the Jacobins, rue Saint-Honoré"

National influence
Rules and regulations were soon established, and in no time the Society dove right into the political fury. Several accounts report that the women of the Society would wear the red caps of liberty to signify their alliance with the revolution. They began to have regular meetings, and attended the National Convention assemblies as much as possible. At the Convention, members of the galleries would cheer at speeches they agreed with, and boo and make a general ruckus at things they disagreed with. The Girondins, for their part, grew tired of the heckling and designated specific galleries for Girondin supporters. The Society was outraged. At their next meeting, a motion was passed to do all they could to stop this. From then on, women from the Society would stand guard at the doors to these specific galleries, refusing entrance to them. The Society also worked jointly with the Cordeliers club on several occasions. On May 19, they presented to the Convention a joint delegation to demand harsher laws for counter-revolutionaries and those suspected of being counter-revolutionaries.

Very soon after came the uprising of May 31 to June 2. Around thirty Girondins were expelled from the Convention. The Montagnards were now in charge. The Society did as much as they could to help this insurrection, supporting the radical Jacobins all the way. When the new Montagnard Constitution was adopted in late June, the Society praised it and the Convention, joining in the celebratory festivities. They continued to support the new policies and delegations presented by the Jacobins.

On July 13, 1793, Jean-Paul Marat, a left-wing radical whom the Society admired, was stabbed to death by Charlotte Corday. Corday supported the Girondins, and hated Marat's radical leftist paper, L'Ami du peuple. Marat's death hit the Society hard. During the funeral, the Society women carried the bathtub where he was murdered and threw flowers on his body. On July 24, the Society swore to raise an obelisk in memory of his legacy. This obelisk took until August 18 to erect. The Society was so caught up in this, that they remained politically inactive from the time of Marat's death to the day the obelisk was completed. That night, they vowed to focus on the issue of national security.

After this occurrence, the Society began to drift away from the Jacobins and toward the Enragés, a political group led by Jacques Roux, Jean Varlet and Théopile Leclerc, which supported strict economic control and harsh national security. The Society began to feel that the Montagnards were not inclusive enough of the radical demands of the leftist Enragés.

In September, the Society became even more deeply involved. Campaigning for numerous petitions, they helped enact much of the legislation throughout the month. Pierre Roussel reported hearing at a meeting of the Society a proposal "to present to the Convention...[a call for] a decree obliging women to wear the national cockade." This petition was to become quite influential in the history of the Society. On September 21, as per the Society's demands, the National Convention declared that all women must wear the tricolor cockade of the revolution. Many women hated this decree and refused to wear the cockade. Market women had already begun to turn on the Society. They opposed the Society's views on price controls, among other issues.

Dissolution
September 16, 1793 marked the beginning of the end for the Society. Claire Lacombe, then president of the Society, was publicly denounced by the Jacobins to the Committee of General Security who accused her of "making counterrevolutionary statements" and having associated and aided a "notorious counterrevolutionary, the enrage Leclerc". Lacombe did her best to defend herself, but it was too late. She was briefly detained and then set free. The seed of distrust had been planted. The Society tried in vain to continue to petition the Convention. Most of the issues that they now dealt with were more trivial and less radical than their previous campaigns.

Around the same time, women, especially women merchants, began to be very suspicious of women wearing the cockade and red liberty bonnets. Violence started in the streets between those women who supported the cockades, notably the Society for Revolutionary Republican Women, and those who did not. The market women went to the Convention with their problem and petitioned that the Society be abolished. On October 30, 1793, the National Convention decreed that "clubs and popular societies of women, under whatever denomination, are forbidden". The Society of Revolutionary Republican Women was officially dissolved, despite numerous protests by leading figures in the club.

"The sans culotte, Chaumette said when he dissolved women's clubs in October 1793, [that he] had a right to expect from his wife [to attend to] the running of his home while he attended political meetings: hers was the care of the family: this was the full extent of her civic duties."

Club organization and regulation
The Society of Revolutionary Republican Women had a very organized governing system. The presiding officers consisted of:
 Club President - Elected for one month at a time
 Club Vice-President - Elected for one month at a time
 Four Secretaries - Elected for one month at a time
 Club Treasurer - Elected for three months at a time
 Two Assistant Treasurers - Elected for three months at a time
 One Archivist - Elected for three months at a time
 One Assistant Archivist - Elected for three months at a time
 Two Monitors - Elected for one month at a time

There were three committees in the Society: the Administration Committee, the Relief Committee and the Correspondence Committee. These committees each had twelve elected members each. All of the voting within the Society was done by roll-call voting.

The Society itself had around one hundred seventy members, of which around one hundred were regularly attending meetings. To become a member, one had to be "presented by a member and seconded by two more members", and she had to take an oath "to live for the Republic or die for it". There was also a minimum age of eighteen, but women were allowed to bring their children with them.

Prominent members
 Pauline Léon, co-founder and president
 Claire Lacombe, co-founder 
 Anne Félicité Colombe, radical publisher
 Constance Evrard, cook, associate of Pauline Leon, honored by the Revolution de Paris for having proposed to join the "battalion of tyrannicides".

See also
 Fraternal Society of Patriots of Both Sexes

References

Culture of the French Revolution
Groups of the French Revolution
1793 in France
Women in the French Revolution